Bârsa may refer to the following places in Romania:

 Bârsa, a commune in Arad County
 Bârsa, a village in the commune Someș-Odorhei, Sălaj County
 Bârsa (Olt), a tributary of the river Olt in Brașov County, Romania
 Bârsa (Someș), a tributary of the river Someș in Sălaj County, Romania
 Bârsa Tămașului, a tributary of the river Bârsa in Brașov County, Romania
 Bârsa Fierului, a tributary of the river Bârsa in Brașov County, Romania
 Bârsa lui Bucur, a tributary of the river Bârsa in Brașov County, Romania

See also 
 Bârsău (river)